Tural Aghalarzade is an Azerbaijani karateka. He won one of the bronze medals in the men's 67kg event at the 2021 Islamic Solidarity Games held in Konya, Turkey.

In 2021, he won one of the bronze medals in the men's team kumite event at the World Karate Championships held in Dubai, United Arab Emirates.

Achievements

References

External links 
 

Living people
Year of birth missing (living people)
Place of birth missing (living people)
Azerbaijani male karateka
Islamic Solidarity Games medalists in karate
Islamic Solidarity Games competitors for Azerbaijan
21st-century Azerbaijani people